The Walther HP (Heerespistole) was a pre-war commercial version of what would later become the Walther P 38.

Description
About 30,000 Walther HP pistols were produced. The vast majority were chambered in 9×19mm, but several hundred were also produced in .30 Luger and are very rare and desirable today. The Walther HP was exported to Sweden in 1939 where it was adopted as the new service pistol (as Pistol m/39) of the Swedish Armed Forces. At the outbreak of World War II sales of the pistol were stopped after only 1500 pistols had been delivered so the Husqvarna m/40 was adopted instead.

References

External links
 http://www.pcpages.com/p38/history.html

Walther semi-automatic pistols
9mm Parabellum semi-automatic pistols
7.65×21mm Parabellum semi-automatic pistols